Swainsthorpe was a railway station in Swainsthorpe, England, around five miles south of Norwich. It was opened in 1850 when the Great Eastern Railway constructed the line between London and Norwich. It was the first station south of the terminus at Norwich Victoria. It was well served, in 1889 there were eight trains each way on weekdays. Journey time into Norwich was approximately nine minutes.

Swainsthorpe closed in 1954 as the relatively small population of Swainsthorpe meant it was considered a surplus to requirements. Today trains run straight through from Norwich to Diss.

Former services

References

External links
 Swainsthorpe station on navigable 1946 O. S. map

Disused railway stations in Norfolk
Former Great Eastern Railway stations
Railway stations in Great Britain opened in 1850
Railway stations in Great Britain closed in 1954